Rhodophthitus tricoloraria is a moth of the family Geometridae. It is found in the Democratic Republic of the Congo, Malawi, Namibia, Rwanda, Tanzania and Uganda.

The forewings of this species are yellowish white with black, parallel dashed lines. Hindwings are light-ochreous yellow with black central cell spot. The female has a wingspan of 54 mm.

References

 Mabille 1890a. "Voyage de M. Ch. Alluaud dans le territoire d'Abssinie (Afrique occidentale) en juillet et août 1886, 4e mémoire; Lépidoptères, avec des notes sur quelques autres espèces d'Afrique (Rhopalocera et Heterocera)". - Annales de la Société Entomologique de France (6)10:17–51, pls. 2, 3

Moths described in 1890
Ennominae
Moths of Africa